Cosmic Camouflage is a multidirectional shooter for the BBC Micro and Acorn Electron. It was released in 1988 as the sequel to Acornsoft's Meteors. Both games are clones of the 1979 Atari, Inc. arcade video game Asteroids.

The game was only available on the compilation Play It Again Sam 4, along with Frak!, Spellbinder, and either Grand Prix Construction Set (BBC) or Guardian (Electron).

Gameplay

The player controls a spaceship in order to avoid and destroy asteroids. The controls are rotate, thrust and fire. It expands on Meteors by introducing different types of asteroids and enemies, and a limited use camouflage function that allows the player to pass through asteroids and enemies.

Reception
Electron User called it a "radically improved" game compared to its predecessor, concluding "Cosmic Camouflage is a novel implementation of a classic, and if you enjoyed Meteors you'll love this upgrade". Although individual games weren't given a score, the compilation overall was given a score of 9/10 and awarded "Golden Game" status.

References 

1988 video games
Acornsoft games
BBC Micro and Acorn Electron games
BBC Micro and Acorn Electron-only games
Europe-exclusive video games
Multidirectional shooters
Single-player video games
Superior Software games
Video game clones
Video games developed in the United Kingdom